John Fitzgerald Duffy (born November 22, 1963)  is Professor of Law at University of Virginia School of Law in Charlottesville, Virginia.  He is a Legal Commentator and Author who has written numerous articles and co-authored a scholarly book on Patent Law (listed at his University of Virginia faculty webpage below).  He previously served as law clerk to Antonin Scalia, Associate Justice of the Supreme Court of the United States, and  Stephen F. Williams, Judge of the United States Court of Appeals for the District of Columbia Circuit.  Between these two assignments, he served as an attorney at the Office of Legal Counsel in the United States Department of Justice.  In addition to clerking for Justice Scalia, John Duffy has been very influential in regard to constitutional law and the appointment of federal judges.

Duffy served as co-counsel for petitioner KSR in the U.S. Supreme Court case on the law of patent obviousness, KSR v. Teleflex.

Duffy received a Bachelor of Arts in physics from Harvard University in 1985 and was awarded a Juris Doctor by the University of Chicago Law School in 1989. Duffy is a graduate of Holy Spirit High School in Absecon, New Jersey.

Patent reform
Professor Duffy has called for the demonopolization of the US and other patent offices as a means for improving the efficiency and thoroughness of patent examination.

Books
(With Herz, Michael). A Guide to Judicial and Political Review of Federal Agencies. Chicago: American Bar Association, Section of Administrative Law and Regulatory Practice, 2005.
(with Merges, Robert Patrick). Patent Law and Policy: Cases and Materials. 4th ed.. Newark, NJ: LexisNexis, 2007.

See also
 Demonopolization
 List of law clerks of the Supreme Court of the United States (Seat 9)

References

External links
University of Virginia faculty webpage

1963 births
Living people
20th-century American lawyers
21st-century American lawyers
American legal scholars
Harvard University alumni
Holy Spirit High School (New Jersey) alumni
Law clerks of the Supreme Court of the United States
University of Chicago Law School alumni
University of Virginia School of Law faculty